North Tayside was a constituency of the Scottish Parliament (Holyrood). It elected one Member of the Scottish Parliament (MSP) by the plurality (first past the post) method of election. Also, however, it was one of nine constituencies in the Mid Scotland and Fife electoral region, which elects seven additional members, in addition to nine constituency MSPs, to produce a form of proportional representation for the region as a whole.

Electoral region 

The other eight constituencies of the mid Scotland and Fife Region are: Dunfermline East, Dunfermline West, Fife Central, Fife North East, Kirkcaldy, Ochil, Perth and Stirling.

The region covers all of the Clackmannanshire council area, all of the Fife council area, all of the Perth and Kinross council area, all of the Stirling council area and parts of the Angus council area.

Constituency boundaries and council areas 

The  constituency was created at the same time as the Scottish Parliament, in 1999, with the name and boundaries of a pre-existing Westminster (House of Commons) constituency. In 2005, however, Scottish Westminster constituencies were generally replaced with new larger constituencies. For representation at Westminster, the area of the Holyrood constituency is now divided between the Perth and North Perthshire Westminster constituency and the Angus Westminster constituency.

The Holyrood constituency of North Tayside covered a northern portion of the Perth and Kinross council area and a northern portion of the Angus council area.

The rest of the Perth and Kinross council area was covered by the Mid Scotland and Fife constituencies of Perth and Ochil and the North East Scotland constituency of Angus.

The rest of the Angus council area was covered by the Angus constituency.

The Perth constituency was entirely within the Perth and Kinross council area, south of the Tayside North constituency.

The Ochil constituency covered a south-eastern portion of the Perth and Kinross council area, the Clackmannanshire council area, and a south-eastern portion of the Stirling council area.

The Angus constituency covered a small eastern portion of the Perth and Kinross council, a southern portion of the Angus council area, and north-western and north-eastern portions of the City of Dundee council area.

Characteristics of the constituency 
The constituency was a relatively prosperous, largely rural, Lowland seat, on the fringe of the Highlands, with successful livestock farming, fruit-growing and tourism interests, a combination of small towns and rich agricultural land, with relatively low unemployment. It included the towns of Pitlochry, Forfar and Blairgowrie. The south-western area, near the town of Perth, is the most populous.

Member of the Scottish Parliament 
John Swinney had represented the constituency for the SNP since the first Scottish election in 1999. He was the Cabinet Secretary for Finance, and was SNP leader from 2000 to 2004.

Election results

Footnotes 

Scottish Parliament constituencies and regions 1999–2011
1999 establishments in Scotland
Constituencies established in 1999
2011 disestablishments in Scotland
Constituencies disestablished in 2011
Politics of Angus, Scotland
Forfar
Politics of Perth and Kinross
Brechin
Kirriemuir
Coupar Angus
Blairgowrie and Rattray
Pitlochry